François Dilasser (5 March 1926 –  16 September 2012) was a French painter.

Biography 
François Dilasser was born March 5, 1926, in  Lesneven, France.  He was involved in painting since childhood. From 1970, he regularly exhibited in galleries, museums and art centers. He participated in the Salon d'Automne in Paris from 1972 to 1976, in the Salon des Réalités Nouvelles from 1973 to 1984, and in numerous collective exhibitions in Brittany. Dilasser  passed away on September 16, 2012, in his hometown of Lesneven.

Solo exhibitions (Selection) 

 2022: Le bruit de nos vies, Eymoutiers,  Nouvelle-Aquitaine, Fr
 2018: Les Paysages de François Dilasser, Galerie de Rohan, Landerneau, Fr
 2016 Dilasser, le dessin, Musée des Beaux-Arts de Brest, Brittany, Fr
 2016: Dilasser chez lui, Musée du Léon, Lesneven, Fr
 2015: Des histoires sans fin, MAMCO, Geneva, Switzerland
 2013: François Dilasser. L'atelier – Œuvres choisies 1972-2007, Domaine de Kerguéhennec, Bignan, Fr
 2009: Les rois ont perdu leur couronne pour un chapeau, Musée des Beaux-Arts de Bordeaux, Bordeaux, Fr
 2008: Les rois ont perdu leur couronne pour un chapeau,  Musée des Beaux-Arts de Brest, Brittany, Fr
 2003: Planètes, Étoiles, Galerie Frédéric Giroux, Paris, Fr
 2002: Claire Brétécher rencontre François Dilasser, portraits/autoportraits, Faculty of Letters and Human Sciences - Victor Segalen, Brest , Fr
 2001: Abbey of Sainte-Trinité, Caen, Caen, Fr

Gallery

References

External links 

 Official Website

1926 births
2012 deaths
20th-century French male artists
19th-century French male artists
20th-century French painters